Franck Boli (born 7 December 1993) is an Ivorian professional footballer who plays as a forward for Portland Timbers.

Club career
Boli signed with Eliteserien side Stabæk Fotball on 3 January 2012. The leader of sports at Stabæk Fotball, Inge André Olsen said; "Boli has many qualities, with his technically good finishing and quick pace".

On 26 February 2015, Boli signed for Chinese Super League side Liaoning Whowin.

In 2016, Boli signed for the Norwegian club Aalesunds FK, in what the club claimed was a 1-year loan from Liaoning. In an article in the football magazine Josimar from 10 May 2019, NFF confirmed that Boli signed for Aalesunds FK on a free transfer from the Ivorian amateur club Williamsville AC before the 2016 season.

Boli returned to Stabæk on 20 December 2016, signing a three-year contract with the club. After he finished as top scorer of the 2018 Eliteserien, his contract was extended through 2021.

Ferencváros
On 1 August 2019, Boli signed for Hungarian champions Ferencváros, making him the second Eliteserien signing of the team in two years, following breakout performer Tokmac Nguen.

On 16 June 2020, Ferencváros clinched the championship by defeating Budapest Honvéd FC at the Hidegkuti Nándor Stadion on the 30th match day of the 2019–20 Nemzeti Bajnokság I season.

On 13 March 2023, Boli signed with Major League Soccer side Portland Timbers on a one-year deal.

International career
Boli made his debut for the Ivory Coast national team on 3 September 2021 when he came on as a substitute for Jean Evrard Kouassi in the 62nd minute of a 2022 FIFA World Cup qualifier against Mozambique which ended in a 0–0 away draw.

Career statistics

Honours
Ferencváros
NB I: 2019–20, 2020–21, 2021–22
Magyar Kupa: 2021–22

Individual
 Eliteserien top scorer: 2018

References

External links
 

1993 births
Living people
Footballers from Abidjan
Ivorian footballers
Association football forwards
Ivory Coast international footballers
Eliteserien players
Norwegian First Division players
Chinese Super League players
Nemzeti Bajnokság I players
Stabæk Fotball players
Liaoning F.C. players
Aalesunds FK players
Ferencvárosi TC footballers
Portland Timbers players
Ivorian expatriate footballers
Ivorian expatriate sportspeople in Norway
Expatriate footballers in Norway
Ivorian expatriate sportspeople in China
Expatriate footballers in China
Ivorian expatriate sportspeople in Hungary
Expatriate footballers in Hungary
Ivorian expatriate sportspeople in the United States
Expatriate soccer players in the United States